John C. Metzler may refer to:
 John C. Metzler Sr., superintendent of Arlington National Cemetery
 John C. Metzler Jr., his son, American civil servant  and superintendent of Arlington National Cemetery